"Lights and Shadows" is a song performed by Dutch girl group OG3NE. The song represented the Netherlands in the Eurovision Song Contest 2017. It was written by Rick Vol and Rory de Kievit. The song was released as a digital download on 3 March 2017 through BMG.

Eurovision Song Contest

On 29 October 2016, it was announced that OG3NE would be representing the Netherlands in the Eurovision Song Contest 2017. In January, it was confirmed that there were three songs in the running to represent the Netherlands, and that one of them was written by Rick Vol, the father of the three members of OG3NE. It was confirmed that Vol's song had been selected on 2 February. The song title was revealed to be "Lights and Shadows" on 2 March, while the song was released the following day. The Netherlands competed in the first half of the second semi-final at the Eurovision Song Contest and finished in 11th place in the final.

Track listing

Charts

Release history

References

Eurovision songs of the Netherlands
Eurovision songs of 2017
2017 songs
2017 singles
O'G3NE songs